|}
{| class="collapsible collapsed" cellpadding="0" cellspacing="0" style="clear:right; float:right; text-align:center; font-weight:bold;" width="280px"
! colspan="3" style="border:1px solid black; background-color: #77DD77;" | Also Ran

The 2013 Epsom Derby (known as the Investec Derby for sponsorship reasons) was the 234th annual running of the Derby horse race. It took place at Epsom Downs Racecourse on 1 June 2013.

The race was won by Ruler of the World, at odds of 7/1 ridden by jockey Ryan Moore. The winner gave Aidan O'Brien his fourth success and was the first horse since Shergar to win both the Chester Vase and the Derby. The favourite Dawn Approach finished last of the twelve runners.

Race synopsis 
Dawn Approach, who had been sired by 2008 Derby winner New Approach, was a 5-4 favorite leading into the race, having won the 2013 2000 Guineas Stakes, the first leg of Britain's Triple Crown, by 5 lengths.  The only other horse from the 2000 Guineas was Mars, going off at 12–1.  Appearing in his third race was Ruler of the World, who did not race as a two-year-old, but he won his first race, a maiden race at Curragh by 3 1/2 lengths and also took the Chester Vase by six lengths.  Ruler of the World went off at 7-1 odds.

Present for the race, as in years past, was Queen Elizabeth II, along with a crowd of 18,237. Favourite Dawn Approach would be ridden by Kevin Manning, who had also ridden his father New Approach to the 2008 Derby win. Ruler of the World, who would go on to win this year's Derby, was ridden by Ryan Moore, after fellow jockey Joseph O'Brien elected to ride Battle of Marengo.  Both Battle of Marengo and Ruler of the World were trained by Aidan O'Brien from Ballydoyle, who is Joseph's father.  O'Brien would train five of the twelve horses in the race, also including Mars, Flying the Flag, and Festive Cheer.

At the start of the race, favourite Dawn Approach showed little discipline, and was out of the running by the first furlong.  Though he led briefly at the one-mile mark, he would fall to the back of the pack and finished last, half a length behind Ocean Applause.  Early in the straight Ruler of the World overtook his stable companion Battle of Marengo and established a clear advantage which he maintained throughout the final quarter mile and won by a length and a half. Libertarian finished strongly, overtaking several horses in the closing strides to finish second ahead of Galileo Rock and Battle of Marengo.

Following the race, winning jockey Ryan Moore stated "I planned to be a bit closer but I just didn’t get away very well —- it was a very messy race."  Trainer Aiden O'Brien, on winning his fifth Derby stated that Ruler of the World "quickened up well that day and won like a very good horse."

Race details
 Sponsor: Investec
 Winner's prize money: £782,314
 Going: Good
 Number of runners: 12
 Winner's time: 2 minutes, 39.06 seconds

Full result

Winner details
Further details of the winner, Ruler of the World:
 Foaled: 17 March 2010, in Ireland
 Sire: Galileo; Dam: Love Me True (Kingmambo)
 Owner: Derrick Smith, Sue Magnier and Michael Tabor
 Breeder: Southern Bloodstock

Form analysis

Two-year-old races
Notable runs by the future Derby participants as two-year-olds in 2012:
 Dawn Approach – 1st in Coventry Stakes, 1st in Vincent O'Brien Stakes, 1st in Dewhurst Stakes
 Battle of Marengo – ''1st in Beresford Stakes

The road to Epsom
Early-season appearances in 2013 and trial races prior to running in the Derby:
 Dawn Approach – 1st in 2000 Guineas
 Ruler of the World – 1st in Chester Vase
 Libertarian – 1st in Dante Stakes
 Battle of Marengo – 1st in Ballysax Stakes, 1st in Derrinstown Stud Derby Trial
 Ocavango – 1st in Prix Greffulhe
 Chopin – 1st in Dr. Busch-Memorial
 Festive Cheer – 2nd in Prix Hocquart

Subsequent Group 1 wins
Group 1 / Grade I victories after running in the Derby:
 Dawn Approach – St. James's Palace Stakes (2013)

Subsequent breeding careers
Leading progeny of participants in the 2013 Epsom Derby.

Sires of Group/Grade One winners
Ruler of the World (1st)
 Iridessa – 1st Fillies' Mile (2018), 1st Matron Stakes, 1st Pretty Polly Stakes (Ireland), 1st Breeders' Cup Filly & Mare Turf (2019)

Other Stallions
Dawn Approach (12th) – Musis Amica (2nd Prix De Diane 2018), Mary Tudor (3rd Irish Oaks 2018), Madhmoon (2nd Epsom Derby (2019)Ocovango (5th) – Langer Dan – 1st Wensleydale Juvenile Hurdle (2019)Battle Of Marengo (4th) – Sired flat and jumps winnersLibertarian (2nd) – Offspring yet to race, several sold as storesFlying The Flag (8th) – Exported to South Africa

References

Epsom Derby
Epsom Derby
Epsom Derby
Epsom Derby
 2013
2010s in Surrey